Chung Uk Tsuen may refer to:
 Chung Uk Tsuen (Tai Po District), a village in Tai Po District, Hong Kong
 Chung Uk Tsuen (Tuen Mun District), a village in Tuen Mun District, Hong Kong
 Chung Uk Tsuen stop, a Light Rail stop in Tuen Mun, Hong Kong